Suceava Ștefan cel Mare International Airport  is an airport serving the city of Suceava, Romania. The airport is named in honour of the Prince of Moldavia Stephen the Great.

History

Suceava Airport, more popularly known as Salcea Airport, opened in 1962 when the first commercial services started with TAROM. In 1963, the runway was paved, and an apron was built. Services by TAROM were discontinued in 2001 but resumed in 2004. During this absence, the airport was served only by Angel Airlines. In March 2005, the airport was renamed Ștefan cel Mare Airport, and opened to international traffic.

In August 2013, the construction work began, and on 12 January 2014, the airport closed to allow the runway works to continue. The old concrete runway was completely removed, and replaced by an asphalt runway. On 25 October 2015, the airport was officially reopened.

Facilities

Airlines and destinations
The following airlines operate regular scheduled and charter flights at Suceava Airport:

Statistics

Ground transportation
There is a road linking the airport to DN29 (part of the European route E58), the main road between Suceava and Botoșani. It can also be reached from Ukraine by road.

See also
 Aviation in Romania
 List of airports in Romania
 Transport in Romania

References

External links

 Official website
 Google Map - Aerial View
 
 

Airports in Romania
Airport
Airports established in 1962